Ranjan is a name. 'Ran' means Battle and 'jan' means public, in olden days this name was given to generous kings who fight battles for the rights of people.

Ranjan may also refer to: 
Ranjan (actor) (1918–1983) (real name Ramanarayana Venkataramana Sarma), Indian film actor, singer, journalist and writer 
Ranjan Ghosh, Indian screenwriter
Ranjan Ghosh (academic), Indian academic and teacher
Ranjan Madugalle (born 1959), Sri Lankan cricket player
Ranjan Mathai (born 1952), Indian foreign minister
Ranjan Pramod, Indian filmmaker
Ranjan Ramanayake (1963), Sri Lankan actor, film director, and politician
Ranjan Wijeratne (1931–1991) Sri Lankan politician
Ranjan (film), a 2017 Marathi feature film
22543 Ranjan, an asteroid